Mannargudi Sambasiva Bhagavathar (also spelt Bagavathar) (1912–2004) was a Carnatic musician, musicologist, Harikatha exponent and composer.

He served Carnatic music for over seven decades. He was a disciple of Maharajapuram Viswanatha Iyer in music and Madurai Narayana Bhagavatar and Smt Saraswathy Bai in Harikatha.

He performed more than 1000 music concerts and 7000 Harikatha performances all over India. He started composing from his teens and has composed more than 3000 songs in many languages such as Tamil, Telugu and Sanskrit. He composed different musical forms such as Geetham, Varnam, Krithi, Javali, Padam, Thillana, Ragamalika and Harikatha. The first edition of his compositions are published in Tamil in the book 'Sangeetha Ratna Mala'. Sambasiva Bhagavatar's musical discourse of Muthuswami Dikshitar charitram, Ramana Maharshi Charitram, Purandara Dasa charitram and Seetha Kalyanam are brought out in CD's. His compositions (Sahityams) are released in cassettes and CD's.

His composition "Neerajadalanayana" in raga "Maand" was popularised by his guru Maharajapuram Viswanatha Iyer.

Early years 
Sambasiva Bhagavatar was born in Mannargudi in the old Tanjavur district in Tamil Nadu, India in the year 1912 to Rajam Iyer and Meenakshi Ammal. He spent his early years in Mannargudi and later moved to Madras (now Chennai).He studied in Sri Ramakrishna Mission in Mylapore. He then had his carnatic music training through the traditional Gurukulam from Sri Maharajapuram Viswanatha Iyer. He imbibed the spirit of musical style of his Guru Viswanatha Iyer. He was then known as Sambasiva Iyer. He switched over from Carnatic Vocal music to Harikatha Kalakshepam and became known as Sambasiva Bhagavatar.

Family 
Sambasiva Bhagavatar had three sons Rajaraman, Balasubramanian and Madhavan and two daughters Balasaraswathi and Chandra.

Awards and Titles 
Bhagavatar was a recipient of the Government of Tamil Nadu's "Kalaimamani" award. He received many other awards and tiles such as "Harikatha Kalakshepa Jyothi", "Katharathnakara", "Sangeetha Sahithya Jyothi", "Sangeetha Ratnam", "Harikatha Sironmani", "Sangeetha Kala Sikhamani", "Nadakkanal", "Harikatha Ratna", "Kalaseva Nirata", "Sangeetha Harikatha Bhusanam", "Sangeetha Harikatha Kala Praveena", and the Madras Music Academy's "Vaggeyakara Award" in the year 2001 and the special honour in the category of Musician and Musicologist "T.T.K. Award" in the year 1999.

He served as a lecturer in Kathakalakshepam at Tamil Nadu Government College of Music, Chennai and as an inspector of Music and Dance schools for the Tamil Nadu Iyal Isai Nataka Mandram, the cultural wing of the Government of Tamil Nadu. He trained many students in the art of Music and Harikatha Kalakshepam. His prominent disciples included the violinist M. Chandrasekaran, K. V. Krishnan, Lalitha Alladi Ramakrishnan, Jaya Krishnan and others. In Harikatha his disciples include Susheela Achudaraman, Gowri Rajagopal, Shyamala Ramachandran and others.

Compositions 

A few of his Sahityams or compositions are listed below

Service to Thiagaraja sangeetha Vidwath Samajam 
Bhagavatar dedicated a major portion of his life to the growth and development of Sri Thiagaraja Sangeetha Vidwath Samajam in Mylapore, Chennai. He was the Treasurer, Secretary, President and finally chairman and executive trustee of the Samajam. He served the institution for over six decades. As per the advice of Chandrasekarendra Saraswati Swamigal, he installed a Panchaloga Vigraham of Saint Thiagaraja at the Vidhwath Samajam Premises.

References 

1912 births
2004 deaths
Carnatic musicians
People from Tiruvarur district
20th-century Indian musicians
Harikatha exponents